Joghatai County is in Razavi Khorasan province, Iran. The capital of the county is the city of Joghatai. At the 2006 census, the county's population (as Joghatai District of Sabzevar County) was 45,970 in 11,534 households. The following census in 2011 counted 47,920 people in 13,181 households, by which time the district had been separated from the county to form Joghatai County. At the 2016 census, the county's population was 49,175 in 14,923 households.

Administrative divisions

The population history and structural changes of Joghatai County's administrative divisions over three consecutive censuses are shown in the following table. The latest census shows two districts, four rural districts, and one city.

References

 

Counties of Razavi Khorasan Province